Anthidium akermani is a species of bee in the family Megachilidae, the leaf-cutter, carder, or mason bees.

Distribution
This species is found only in the southern edge of Africa.

References

akermani
Insects described in 1937